Ch'alla Qullu (Aymara ch'alla sand, qullu mountain, "sand mountain", also spelled Challa Kkollu) is a mountain in the Chilla-Kimsa Chata mountain range in the Andes of Bolivia which reaches a height of about . It is located in the La Paz Department, Ingavi Province, Jesús de Machaca Municipality. Ch'alla Qullu lies northwest of Chhuxlla Willk'i. The Ch'uñu Jawira ("ch'uñu river", Chuñu Jahuira) originates near the mountain. It flows to the south as a right affluent of the Jach'a Jawira.

References 

Mountains of La Paz Department (Bolivia)